Kemberano is a Papuan language of the Bird's Head Peninsula of West Papua, Indonesia.

Morphology
Kemberano nouns are required to have the following concord suffixes:
–i (masculine nouns)
–o (feminine nouns)

Examples (from Berry and Berry 1987: 86):

References

Nuclear South Bird's Head languages